Leszek Suski (15 April 1930 – 19 April 2007) was a Polish fencer. He competed in the individual and team sabre events at the 1952 Summer Olympics.

References

1930 births
2007 deaths
Polish male fencers
Olympic fencers of Poland
Fencers at the 1952 Summer Olympics
People from Opatów County
Sportspeople from Świętokrzyskie Voivodeship